is a Japanese footballer who plays as a midfielder for Shimizu S-Pulse.

Career statistics

References

External links

2002 births
Living people
Sportspeople from Shizuoka Prefecture
Japanese footballers
Japan youth international footballers
Association football midfielders
Shimizu S-Pulse players
SC Sagamihara players
J1 League players
J2 League players